Maison de Jeanne is a late 15th century house in Sévérac-le-Château, Aveyron, France. It was named for the last known owner of the building and is thought to be the oldest house in Aveyron. The unique appearance of the structure is due to the larger dimensions of the upper floors, which look large compared to the smaller footprint of the first floor.

History 

The building was dated after 1478 and is presumed to be the oldest half-timbered house in the department of Aveyron. The name of the home comes from the last occupant of the home: an artist named Jeanne.

The reason for the unusual design of the building has been attributed to the local tax laws at the time of construction. In Aveyron the taxes of a home were calculated by the amount of land that the ground-level floor occupied. It is thought that the original owner wanted to pay less tax, and built the upper floors wider and larger than the ground floor.

The house was purchased by the municipality of Sévérac in 1995 and restoration and repair work was planned. In 2017, someone shared a photo of the medieval home on the image-sharing site Imgur and it attracted the attention of more than 1.5 million people in two days.

Design 
The home was constructed with a timber frame and from walls made of cob. The home was designed with larger upper floors overhanging a smaller footprint. The building has two storeys and a vaulted cellar containing feed troughs, which indicate that the original owners lived with their animals on the lower floor. Originally the exterior of the home was clad in stone.

In 2019, repairs and renovations on the building began. The renovations were supervised by architect Philippe Blondin. The roof was originally slate tiles, and each roof tile was removed and measured by Serge Causse, with replacements being cut and sized. The exterior masonry work was completed by the Muzzarelli company. The Drulhet company handled the carpentry, and the electricity and plumbing work was completed by the Molinié company. Authentic lime plaster was used in the interior of the house.

References

External links 
Tour of the building

Medieval French architecture
Monuments historiques of Aveyron
14th-century architecture
Houses in France